Indranil Biswas (born 19 October 1964) is an Indian mathematician.  He is professor of mathematics at the Tata Institute of Fundamental Research, Mumbai. He is known for his work in the areas of algebraic geometry, differential geometry, and deformation quantization.

In 2006, the Government of India awarded him the Shanti Swarup Bhatnagar Prize in mathematical sciences for his contributions to "algebraic geometry, centering around moduli problems of vector bundles."

Biography
Biswas is an Indian citizen. He received a Ph.D. in mathematics from the University of Mumbai.

Selected publications

Awards and honours
 Shanti Swarup Bhatnagar Prize for Science and Technology, 2006.
 Fellow, Indian Academy of Sciences (2003).

References

External links

1964 births
20th-century Indian mathematicians
21st-century Indian mathematicians
Algebraic geometers
Fellows of the Indian Academy of Sciences
Living people
Scientists from Mumbai
Tata Institute of Fundamental Research alumni
Academic staff of Tata Institute of Fundamental Research
University of Mumbai alumni
Recipients of the Shanti Swarup Bhatnagar Award in Mathematical Science